Fish Creek is a  long 2nd order tributary to the Cape Fear River in Harnett County, North Carolina.  The lower reaches of this stream are in Raven Rock State Park.

Course
Fish Creek rises in a pond about 1 mile north-northeast of Mamers, North Carolina and then flows southeast and makes a curve northeast to join the Cape Fear River about 4 miles southwest of Kipling, North Carolina.

Watershed
Fish Creek drains  of area, receives about 46.1 in/year of precipitation, has a wetness index of 419.66 and is about 54% forested.

See also
List of rivers of North Carolina

External links
Raven Rock State Park

References

Rivers of North Carolina
Rivers of Harnett County, North Carolina
Tributaries of the Cape Fear River